Estádio Municipal José Maria de Campos Maia, known as José Maria de Campos Maia, is a multi-use stadium in Mirassol, São Paulo, Brazil. It is used mostly for football matches, and has a maximum capacity of 15,000 people.

References

Football venues in São Paulo (state)
Mirassol Futebol Clube
Sports venues in São Paulo (state)